Kamil Mahdalík is a Slovak professional ice hockey player in Slovakia recently with MHC Martin of the Slovak Extraliga.

References

External links

Living people
MHC Martin players
Year of birth missing (living people)
Slovak ice hockey forwards
Expatriate ice hockey players in Croatia
Slovak expatriate sportspeople in Croatia
Slovak expatriate ice hockey people